Gorgeous (released in the Philippines as High Risk) is a 1999 Hong Kong action romantic comedy film written and directed by Vincent Kok who played Lo's assistant, and co-written and produced by Jackie Chan, who also starred in the film. The film co-stars Shu Qi, Tony Leung and Emil Chau. The film performed well at the Hong Kong box office.

Plot
Bu (Shu Qi) is a beautiful young girl from a small Taiwanese fishing village who discovers a romantic message in a bottle. She heads for Hong Kong to find its writer, only to learn that it was in fact written by Albert (Tony Leung Chiu-wai), a lonely gay man. She then meets a wealthy recycling company owner, C.N. (Jackie Chan). They fall in love with each other. The plot is soon thickened by the rivalry between Howie Lo (Emil Chau) and C.N., who are both businessmen who have known each other since their childhood days.

In the English dubbed version, some of the dialogues are changed and a few scenes are edited out. These scenes included one at the airport where Sandra Ng's and Sam Lee's characters conned and robbed Long Yi (Richie Jen) who supposedly is engaged to Bu and another where Stephen Chow's policeman character came to investigate after C.N. fought off Howie Lo's masked goons and Albert's friends who on Bu's request pretended to be gangsters attacking her who in turn is pretending to be the reported missing girlfriend of a Taiwan gangster leader.

Cast
 Jackie Chan as C.N. Chan (T: 陳子午, S: 陈子午, J: can4 zi2 ng5, P: Chén Zǐwǔ)
 Shu Qi as Bu (C: 阿不, J: aa2 bat1, P: Ā-bù)
 Tony Leung as Albert
 Emil Chau as Howie Lo (T: 盧乃華, S: 卢乃华, J: lou4 naai5 faa1, P: Lú Nǎihuá)
 Richie Jen as Long Yi (C: 隆一, J: lung4 jat1, P: Lóngyī)
 Chen Sung-young as Bu's father
 Elaine Jin as Bu's mother
 Bradley James Allan as Alan
 Tats Lau as Lo's assistant
 Vincent Kok as Lo's assistant
 Ken Lo as Lo's assistant
 Kwan Yung as Lo's assistant
 William Tuen as Lo's assistant
 Eric Kot as Man in Pier
 Sandra Ng as thief / Conwoman
 Sam Lee as robber / Frog
 Law Kar-ying as restaurateur
 Stephen Chow as H.K policeman
 Stephen Fung as photographer
 Daniel Wu as photographer's assistant
 Carmen Soo as Gloria
 Jacqueline Li as Michelle
 Siu-wai Cheung as Shelly (as Shelly Zhu)

Featuring cameo appearances Paul Chang, Maggie Cheung Ho-yee, Cheung Tat-ming, Asuka Higuchi, Jo Kuk, Lee Lik-chi, Mark Lui, Edmond So, Kai Man-tin, Ken Wong, Annie Wu, Kitty Yuen, Rocky Lai, Chan Man-ching, Louis Keung and Mars.

Production 

Chan had long wanted to be involved in drama films, but had constantly been dissuaded by Leonard Ho, one of the founders of Golden Harvest and Chan's godfather. Ho had argued that to ensure success in his films, Chan should play to his fanbase by only doing action movies and avoiding the love scenes that may alienate certain markets (notably Japan).
Ho died on 16 February 1998 and Chan left Golden Harvest soon after, seeking a change and a new freedom to make the films he really wanted to. This coincided with his growing fame in the West, due to the international success of the film Rush Hour.

Gorgeous was originally conceived purely as a love story, with Chan as producer, but not as one of the film's cast. In order to secure the actress Shu Qi, the script of the film was re-written and a role for Chan was created. This soon developed into a starring role, and elements of action crept in. However, Gorgeous remains primarily a romantic comedy and so it differs from his usual all-out action films. The action scenes are fewer and there is no real bad guy character – the fight with the nominal enemy (played by Brad Allan) is a pre-arranged bout and both fighters wear boxing gloves – competitive rather than motivated by revenge or the fight for survival.

The director had wanted to use Chan's office as the set for C.N.'s apartment, but this proved impractical, particularly as that section of the office is on the third floor. However, many props from Chan's office were used including his own training dummy.
Chan said of his character C.N., that he was "60-70% Jackie Chan". The clothing the character wears, the training routine he undergoes and healthy lifestyle he maintains, his general good nature and his environmental role are all traits and actions of Chan himself.

Chan summarised the difference between the films Rush Hour and Gorgeous, stating the former was a job, and the latter was his baby. In Rush Hour his role was restricted to actor and action director. In Gorgeous, he was also the producer, editor and was involved in casting.

Although a romantic comedy, the only significant kissing scene was dropped from the main film for fear that it would alienate certain East Asian markets who may not want to see Chan in such a relationship. The underwater kiss scene was retained and appeared amongst the out-takes that accompany the film's closing credits.

The film is notable for casting numerous, then, unknown actors who went on to achieve national and in some cases multi-national success.  These include: Sam Lee, Daniel Wu, Richie Jen and Stephen Fung.

Release
Gorgeous was released in Hong Kong on 12 February 1999. In the Philippines, the film was released as High Risk in early September 2002.

Box office
Gorgeous was a box office success in Hong Kong, grossing HK $40,545,889 during its theatrical run.

Awards and nominations

See also

 Jackie Chan filmography
 List of Hong Kong films

References

External links 
 
 

1999 films
1999 martial arts films
1999 action comedy films
1999 romantic comedy films
Hong Kong action comedy films
Hong Kong romantic action films
Hong Kong martial arts comedy films
Hong Kong romantic comedy films
1990s Cantonese-language films
1990s martial arts comedy films
Mixed martial arts films
Films set in Hong Kong
Films shot in Hong Kong
Films set in Taiwan
Golden Harvest films
Films directed by Vincent Kok
Chinese New Year films
1990s Hong Kong films